This is a list of Brazilian television related events from 2014.

Events
1 April - Vanessa Mesquita wins the fourteenth season of Big Brother Brasil.
30 November - Actor Marcello Melo Jr. and his partner Raquel Guarini win the eleventh season of Dança dos Famosos.
25 December - Danilo Reis & Rafael win the third season of The Voice Brasil.

Debuts
10 March The Noite com Danilo Gentili (2014–present)
16 August - O Show da Luna (2014–present)
22 September - Irmão do Jorel (2014–present)

Television shows

1970s
Vila Sésamo (1972-1977, 2007–present)
Turma da Mônica (1976–present)

1990s
Malhação (1995–present)
Cocoricó (1996–present)

2000s
Big Brother Brasil (2002–present)
Dança dos Famosos (2005–present)
Peixonauta (2009–present)

2010s
Meu Amigãozão (2010–present)
Sítio do Picapau Amarelo (2012-2016)
The Voice Brasil (2012–present)
Historietas Assombradas (para Crianças Malcriadas) (2013–present)

Ending this year

Births

Deaths

See also
2014 in Brazil
List of Brazilian films of 2014